U is the debut studio album by Japanese girl group NiziU. It was released on November 24, 2021, through JYP Entertainment and Sony Music Entertainment Japan. The album has 12 tracks including its 5 singles released previously, the lead single "Chopstick", and the special single "Need U" with an addition of 7 more tracks from the album's limited edition version B. The album was released in three physical versions, one normal version and two limited edition versions, A and B.

Track listing

Charts

Weekly charts

Monthly charts

Year-end charts

References 

2021 albums
JYP Entertainment albums
Sony Music Entertainment Japan albums
NiziU albums